Edmundo Marcelo Méndez Quelal (born 5 December 1968) is a retired Ecuadorian football defender. He was a member of the Ecuador national football team at the 1997 Copa América, and obtained a total number of 11 caps during his career.

References

External links

1968 births
Living people
Footballers from Quito
Association football defenders
Ecuadorian footballers
Ecuador international footballers
C.D. El Nacional footballers
C.D. Cuenca footballers
C.D. Universidad Católica del Ecuador footballers
S.D. Aucas footballers
C.S.D. Macará footballers
1997 Copa América players